Cyperus afromontanus is a species of sedge that is endemic to an area in Uganda.

The species was first formally described by the botanist Kåre Arnstein Lye in 1983.

See also
List of Cyperus species

References

afromontanus
Flora of Uganda
Plants described in 1983
Taxa named by Kåre Arnstein Lye